Empirical Software Engineering is a peer-reviewed scientific journal published by Springer Nature. It was established in 1996 and covers the area of empirical software engineering. The editors-in-chief are Robert Feldt and Thomas Zimmermann.

Abstracting and indexing
The journal is abstracted and indexed in the Science Citation Index Expanded and Current Contents/Engineering, Computing & Technology. According to the Journal Citation Reports, the journal has a 2021 impact factor of 3.762.

Past Editors in Chief 

 Lionel Briand (University of Ottawa).
 Victor Basili (University of Maryland).
 Warren Harrison (Portland State University).

See also
 List of computer science journals
 List of engineering journals and magazines
 IEEE Transactions on Software Engineering

References

External links
 

Springer Science+Business Media academic journals
Computer science journals
Software engineering publications
English-language journals